The 2005 World Table Tennis Championships was held in the Shanghai Grand Stage of Shanghai, China from April 29 to May 6, 2005.

Medal summary

Medal table

Events

Finals

Men's singles
 Wang Liqin def.  Ma Lin 4–2: 11–9, 3–11, 8–11, 11–9,11–9, 11–7

Women's singles
 Zhang Yining def.  Guo Yan, 4–2: 5–11, 11–7, 11–7, 4–11,11–8, 13–11

Men's doubles
 Kong Linghui / Wang Hao def.  Timo Boll / Christian Süß, 4–1: 11–9, 11–3, 11–9, 7–11, 11–6

Women's doubles
 Wang Nan / Zhang Yining def.  Guo Yue / Niu Jianfeng, 4–1: 11–4, 11–5, 10–12, 11–9,11–5

Mixed doubles
 Wang Liqin / Guo Yue def.  Liu Guozheng / Bai Yang, 4–3: 11–4, 6–11, 6–11, 11–7, 11–9, 7–11, 11–6

External links
International Table Tennis Federation (ITTF) website
Official Database

 
World Table Tennis Championships
Table tennis competitions in China
Table
World Table Tennis Championships, 2005
World Table Tennis Championships, 2005
Sports competitions in Shanghai
April 2005 sports events in Asia
2000s in Shanghai
May 2005 sports events in Asia